The 2014 Neste Oil Rally Finland was the eighth round of the 2014 World Rally Championship season. The event was based in Jyväskylä, Finland, and started on 31 July and finished on 3 August after 26 special stages, totaling 360.9 competitive kilometres.

Finnish driver Jari-Matti Latvala won his home Rally Finland for the second time in his career, taking his third victory of the 2014 season.

Entry list

Results

Event standings

Special stages

Power Stage
The "Power stage" was a  stage at the end of the rally.

Standings after the rally

WRC

Drivers' Championship standings

Manufacturers' Championship standings

Other

WRC2 Drivers' Championship standings

WRC3 Drivers' Championship standings

Junior WRC Drivers' Championship standings

References

Results – juwra.com/World Rally Archive	
Results – ewrc-results.com

Finland
Rally Finland
Rally Finland